Dipaenae contenta is a moth of the subfamily Arctiinae first described by Francis Walker in 1854. It is found in the Amazon region.

References

Lithosiini